is a Japanese politician of the Liberal Democratic Party, a member of the House of Representatives in the Diet (national legislature). A native of Gose, Nara and graduate of Keio University, he was elected to the House of Representatives for the first time in 2003. He is affiliated to the revisionist lobby Nippon Kaigi.

Career
Elected 5 times to the House of Representatives (constituency: Kinki proportional)
Board Member of a Company
Executive Chairperson and CEO of a Company
State Minister of Justice
Chairperson, Committee on Judicial Affairs, HR
Chairperson, Federation of Nara Prefecture LDP Branches, LDP
Affiliations:
Asia-Pacific Parliamentarians' Union
Japan-AU Parliamentary Friendship Association
Japan-India Parliamentary Friendship Association
Japan Conference (Nippon Kaigi)
Areas of interest:
Education
Economics and finance
Social security

References 
 
Profile on LDP website: jimin.jp/english/profile/members/120997.html

External links 
 Official website in Japanese.

1944 births
Living people
Politicians from Nara Prefecture
Keio University alumni
Nissan people
Members of the House of Representatives (Japan)
Liberal Democratic Party (Japan) politicians
Members of Nippon Kaigi
21st-century Japanese politicians